Zig Zag, also released as False Witness, is a 1970 American thriller drama film directed by Richard A. Colla and starring George Kennedy. The film was remade in India as Majboor (1974).

Plot
Paul Cameron is an insurance executive who finds out he has a brain tumor.  His family will receive nothing under his current policies, but there is a huge reward for information leading to the arrest of the murderer of a businessman. Cameron frames himself for the murder in the hopes of collecting the reward money for his wife in an anonymous bank account. Cameron is found guilty and sentenced to death, but then is cured of the disease, and escapes in order to find the real killer and clear his name.

Cast
George Kennedy as Paul Cameron
Anne Jackson as Jean Cameron
Eli Wallach as Mario Gambretti
Steve Ihnat as Herb Gates
William Marshall as Morris Bronson
Joe Maross as Lieutenant Hines
Dana Elcar as Harold Tracey
Walter Brooke as Adam Mercer
Anita O'Day as Sheila Mangan
Robert Patten as John Raymond

Soundtrack

The film score was composed, arranged and conducted by Oliver Nelson, and the soundtrack album was released on the MGM label. AllMusic's  Jason Ankeney noted that Nelson did "a particularly strong job of evoking the grittiness of their urban setting" and said that "Recalling vintage jazz in both its atmosphere and vigor, the music navigates  a series of mood and tempo shifts with the precision of a race car moving in and out of traffic". The album also included two tracks with lyrics by Hal David sung by Bobby Hatfield and Roy Orbison singing the Mike Curb composition "Zigzag".

Track listing
All compositions by Oliver Nelson escept as indicated
 "All You Did Was Smile" (lyrics by Hal David) – 1:41
 "Main Title from "Zigzag" – 2:30
 "Guilty, Your Honor" – 1:50
 "It Was You, It Was You" – 2:30
 "Love Theme (Bossa)" – 2:39
 "Earphones" – 2:03
 "Zigzag" (Mike Curb, Robert Enders, Guy Hemric) – 2:50
 "The Other Car" – 3:55
 "Variations of Themes" – 4:50
 "I Call Your Name"(lyrics by Hal David) – 2:32
 "End Title" – 1:05

Personnel
Orchestra arranged and conducted by Oliver Nelson except:

Tracks 1 & 10:
Arranged and conducted by Don Peak with Bobby Hatfield – vocals
Track 7:
Arranged and conducted by Don Peak with Roy Orbison – vocals
Track 9:
Buddy Collette – tenor saxophone
Artie Kane – piano
Joe Mondragon – bass
John Guerin, Victor Feldman – drums

Remakes
The film has been remade in India four times:

the Hindi film Majboor (1974)
the Telugu film Raja (1976)
the Tamil film Naan Vazhavaippen (1979)
the Gujarati film Naseeb No Khel (1982)

References

External links
 
 

1970 films
1970s thriller drama films
American thriller drama films
1970 directorial debut films
Metro-Goldwyn-Mayer films
Films directed by Richard A. Colla
Films about cancer
1970 drama films
1970s English-language films
1970s American films